Anthony Felix Gemignani (born August 23, 1973) is an American chef, restaurateur, and author.  In 2009, Gemignani opened Tony's Pizza Napoletana in the  North Beach neighborhood of San Francisco, California.  Gemignani is a pizzaiolo and chef, having won 13 world titles in pizza making and opening numerous restaurants. He has appeared on multiple reality television series including Food Network Challenge, Bar Rescue on Spike TV, as well as on The Travel Channel and CNN.

Early life and career

Gemignani was born in Fremont, California to Frank and Eileen Gemignani. He grew up on his family's farm, he is a third generation Italian American.

Gemignani graduated from Washington High School in Fremont, later working at his brother Frank Jr.'s restaurant, Pyzano's, in Castro Valley, California, in 1991. Gemignani began his pizza tosser career while at Pyzano's as a way to entertain customers and to show the quality of the dough to diners. He competed all over the world, winning 8 world champion titles for pizza acrobatics between 1995–2007, and earning himself the nickname of the "Michael Jordan of Pizza Throwing". Gemignani traveled the world for 16 years, competing, working in others' kitchens, and learning about regional styles which allowed him to learn each style of pizza and perfect it.

In 2000, while on his honeymoon in Sorrento, Italy, he and his wife Julie dined at Trianon da Ciro in Naples, which motivated him into a lifelong quest to keep learning and striving to become a better pizzaiolo. He paid careful attention to the authentic craft of each style of pizza, respecting its history, while aiming to make it better. This attitude birthed his motto "Respect the Craft" which can be seen on his websites, books, pizza boxes, and even tattooed on his hands.

Gemignani formed the World Pizza Champions in 2005, which is made up of over 60 team members who have each earned the highest awards in the pizza industry, along with television appearances, Guinness World Records, and respect as leading professionals and pioneers in the pizza industry.

In 2007, Gemignani took the title of "World Champion Pizza Maker" at the World Pizza Cup in Naples, Italy. Gemignani was the first American and non-Neapolitan to ever take this title. Gemignani is the first and only Triple Crown winner for baking at the International Pizza Championships in Lecce, Italy, meaning, he won three first place titles in one competition.

Restaurants

Tony's Pizza Napoletana

Gemignani opened his first restaurant, Tony's Pizza Napoletana, in July 2009, with partners Bruno DiFabio and Nancy Puglisi, in San Francisco's North Beach. The restaurant has 7 pizza ovens.

Tony's Pizza Napoletana is recognized as one of the city's best pizzerias. Along with being named "The Best Pizzeria in America" by Forbes magazine, the restaurant has received multiple accolades in a number of publications, both local and national, including Zagat, USA Today, The San Francisco Chronicle, The Huffington Post, Food and Wine, Travel + Leisure, Fox News, and others.

The Original Slicehouse & Coal-Fired Pizza by Tony Gemignani

Opening in 2010, Gemignani took ownership of an adjacent deli. Seeing this as an opportunity to serve more styles of pizzas like classic New York style slices, Sicilian, and California style slices, along with Chicago Beef Sandwiches and other deli favorites, the slicehouse allowed people to enjoy Gemignani's pizza without the infamous wait times usually seen at his flagship restaurant.

Since the opening in North Beach, Gemignani has expanded his slice house concept to include concessions stalls in Oracle Park & Chase Center, as well as multiple locations in California and Nevada under the name Slice House by Tony Gemignani. Tony G's Super Delicious Pizza is Tony Gemignani's newest slice house concept in Meridian, Idaho with its delivery only concept under Crave Delivery.

Pizza Rock

In 2011, Gemignani, Hewitt and Karpaty opened Pizza Rock in Sacramento California, with a focus on rock 'n' roll and great pizza. Pizza Rock offers many of the same items as Tony's Pizza Napoletana but features events such as Acoustic Brunch and live DJs performing from a custom Peterbilt truck. Now in Sacramento, California, Las Vegas, and Henderson, Nevada, Pizza Rock has received accolades in a number of publications, including the Sacramento and The Chew.

Capo's

Gemignani's Chicago-style pizza and whiskey bar, Capo's, opened in November 2012 just two blocks away from Tony's Pizza Napoletana; it was designed to feel like a prohibition era speakeasy. The restaurant invites family style dining, serving four styles of Chicago-style pizza: Deep Dish, Stuffed, Cast Iron Pan, and Cracker Thin; along with Southern Italian dishes. Favorite items include the Quattro Forni, a thick, square cut pizza cooked in four ovens that is a variation on a pizza baked in three ovens that won Gemignani an international championship; The Dillinger and The Crown Point, Cast Iron Pan pizzas, that won the World's Best Pan Pizza and the Best of the Best at the International Pizza Challenge in Las Vegas in 2014 and 2016, and subsequently earned Chef Matt Molina the title of Pizza Maker of the Year in 2014 and Best of the Best Champion in 2016.

Tony's of North Beach

Opened in 2013 at the Graton Resort & Casino in Rohnert Park, California, Tony's of North Beach offers many styles of pizzas made by Tony Gemignani. The menu offers eight kinds of pizzas made in three different kinds of ovens, family-style pasta dinners, sandwiches, and salads.

International School of Pizza

Gemigani is the first certified Master Instructor in the United States. He opened the International School of Pizza and the United States School of Pizza under the Scuola Italiana Pizzaioli. Gemignani and his fellow instructors certify students from around the world, and the certifications come direct from Italy with strict guidelines and theory followed from the Scuola Italiana Pizzaioli. Gemignani also offers non-professional home chef courses, designed to teach home cooks how to make restaurant   quality pizza in their own kitchens.

Retail

Giovanni Italian Specialties opened in October 2017, Tony brought an "old-world Italian specialties shop" to the neighborhood of North Beach. Giovanni Italian Specialties offers fresh pasta, specialty cooking tools, cook books, and offers focaccia and piadina daily.

Tony Gemignani’s California Artisan Type 00 Pizza Blend flour is made by Central Milling.

Filmography

Books

Gemignani has authored three books:

 Pizza: More than 60 Recipes for Delicious Homemade Pizza (Chronicle Books, July 28, 2005) 
 Tony and the Pizza Champions (Chronicle Books, March 4, 2009) 
 The Pizza Bible (Ten Speed Press, October 28, 2014)

Awards

Titles 
 First Place Pizza All Stars by Antonio Mezzero Porto, Portugal 2018 Cooking Pizza Neo Napoletana paired with Croft Port
 First Place Best Pizza (Pizza in Pala) World Pizza Championships Parma, Italy 2016
 8 Time World Champion Pizza Acrobat (1995, 1996, 1997, 2000, 2001, 2005, 2006, 2007)
 World Champion Pizza Maker, 2007 World Pizza Cup, Naples, Italy
 Roman Pizza, 2011 World Championships of Pizza Makers, Naples, Italy
 Best of the Best World Champion/Master Pizza Maker, 2012 International Pizza Expo, Las Vegas, Nevada
 2007 "Squadra Acrobatica" Pizza Olympics, Salsomaggiore, Italy
 2006 "Squadra Acrobatica", Salsomaggiore, Italy 
 2005 "Team Acrobatic", Las Vegas, Nevada 
 2005 Food Network "Pizza Battle" 
 2005 Icon Estates Pizza Battaglia 
 1st Triple Crown Winner in Pizza History
 Gold Cup Pizza Classica, 2008 International Pizza Makers Challenge, Lecce, Italy
 Gold Cup Pizza Teglia, 2008 International Pizza Makers Challenge, Lecce, Italy 
 Gold Cup Acrobat, 2008 International Pizza Makers Challenge, Lecce, Italy
 Best Pizza USA, 2008 World Pizza Championships, Salsomaggiore, Italy
 2006 Pizza Champions Challenge, Food Network
 Master of Champions, ABC TV
 Inducted into the Legends of Pizza, 2006

Guinness Book of World Records 
 Largest pizza base spun in two minutes (36.5 inches) 2006
 Most Consecutive Rolls Across the Shoulders in 30 seconds (37 times) 2006
 World's Longest Pizza (1,930.39 m) 2017
 Most people tossing pizza dough (263) 2014

References

External links
 Official website
 
 
 

1973 births
American people of Italian descent
Living people